Saydy is the name of several rural localities in the Sakha Republic, Russia:
Saydy, Tomponsky District, Sakha Republic, a selo in Ynginsky Rural Okrug of Tomponsky District
Saydy, Verkhoyansky District, Sakha Republic, a selo in Eginsky Rural Okrug of Verkhoyansky District